Zhao Qiguo (25 February 1930 – 3 January 2023) was a Chinese soil scientist, and an academician of the Chinese Academy of Sciences. He was president of the Soil Science Society of China from 1987 to 1995.

Biography
Zhao was born in Hankou (now Wuhan, Hubei), on 25 February 1930. In 1949, he was admitted to the Department of Agronomy, Wuhan University. Due to the 1952 reorganisation of Chinese higher education, he became a student of Huazhong Agricultural University.

After university in 1953, Zhao became the leader of Yunnan and Guizhou South China Rubber and Tropical Crop Suitable Forest Land Investigation Team. Between 1964 and 1968, he was deputy leader and than leader of China's expert group in Cuba. In 1973, he became the leader of Heilongjiang Wildland Resources Investigation Team, and served until 1978. In 1983, he was promoted to become director of the Institute of Soil Science, Chinese Academy of Sciences, a post he kept until 1995.

On 3 January 2023, Zhao died in Nanjing, Jiangsu, at the age of 92.

Honours and awards
 1991 Member of the Chinese Academy of Sciences (CAS)
 1991 State Natural Science Award (Second Class)
 2004 State Science and Technology Progress Award (Second Class)

References

1930 births
2023 deaths
People from Wuhan
Scientists from Hubei
Huazhong Agricultural University alumni
Wuhan University alumni
Members of the Chinese Academy of Sciences
20th-century Chinese scientists
21st-century Chinese scientists